Bert Aldon Zagers (January 30, 1933 – September 2, 1992) was an American football player who played halfback and defensive back for the Washington Redskins of the National Football League (NFL).

Early life
Zagers was born in Fremont, Michigan to Evert and Opal Lee Zagers.  He attended and played high school football at Cadillac High School in Cadillac, Michigan, where he won a state championship in 1949.  He also participated in track and field.  Zagers was inducted into the Cadillac High School Hall of Fame in 1951.

College career
Zagers attended and played college football at Michigan State University.  In 1952, the Spartans completed a perfect undefeated season and were recognized as the national champions by most major polling organizations including the AP Poll and Coaches' Poll.

Professional career
Zagers was drafted in the seventh round of the 1955 NFL Draft by the Detroit Lions.  He was then traded to the Washington Redskins, along with Bob Trout, for Harry Gilmer. Zagers played his entire career with the Redskins and in 1957, he led the NFL in punt returns.

Personal life
Zagers fought with the United States Army in the Korean War, where he attained the rank of private first class.  After retiring from playing, he was the head coach at Theodore Roosevelt High School in Wyandotte, Michigan in the late 1960s and early 1970s.  He died on September 2, 1992, in Traverse City, Michigan.

References

External links
 

1933 births
1992 deaths
American football defensive backs
American football halfbacks
Michigan State Spartans football players
Washington Redskins players
High school football coaches in Michigan
United States Army personnel of the Korean War
United States Army soldiers
Players of American football from Michigan
People from Fremont, Michigan